Forsyth is a city in and the county seat of Monroe County, Georgia, United States. The population was 4,384 at the 2020 census, up from 3,788 in 2010. Forsyth is part of the Macon Metropolitan Statistical Area.

The Forsyth Commercial Historic District is listed on the National Register of Historic Places and is a tourist attraction. It includes the Monroe County Courthouse and Courthouse Square as well as the surrounding area, including several examples of 19th-century architecture. Forsyth is also home to the Confederate Cemetery, Tift College, and Rum Creek Wildlife Management Area.

History
Forsyth was established in 1823. That same year, the seat of Monroe County was transferred to Forsyth from Johnstonville. Forsyth  was named for John Forsyth, governor of Georgia from 1827 to 1829 and Secretary of State under presidents Andrew Jackson and Martin Van Buren.

Geography
The city is located along Interstate 75 and U.S. Route 41 northwest of Macon. I-75 runs southeast to northwest through the eastern part of town, with access from exits 185 through 188. The interstate leads southeast  to downtown Macon and northwest  to Atlanta. US 41 runs through the downtown area from east to west, leading southeast to Macon and west  to Barnesville. Other highways that run through the city include Georgia State Routes 18, 42, and 83.

The city sits atop a ridge which drains southwest to tributaries of Tobesofkee Creek and northeast to tributaries of Rum Creek; both creeks are southeast-flowing tributaries of the Ocmulgee River.

Demographics

2020 census

As of the 2020 United States census, there were 4,384 people, 1,687 households, and 883 families residing in the city.

2000 census
As of the census of 2000, there were 3,776 people, 1,457 households, and 1,027 families residing in the city. The racial makeup of the city was 40.3% White, 57.6% African American, 0.7% Native American, and 0.90% from two or more races. Hispanic or Latino of any race were 1.6% of the population.

There were 1,457 households, out of which 30.7% had children under the age of 18 living with them, 39.5% were married couples living together, 26.4% had a female householder with no husband present, and 29.5% were non-families. 26.3% of all households were made up of individuals, and 13.5% had someone living alone who was 65 years of age or older. The average household size was 2.57 and the average family size was 3.10.

In the city, the population was spread out, with 26.6% under the age of 18, 8.3% from 18 to 24, 28.2% from 25 to 44, 22.8% from 45 to 64, and 14.2% who were 65 years of age or older. The median age was 36 years. For every 100 females, there were 82.2 males. For every 100 females age 18 and over, there were 74.8 males.

The median income for a household in the city was $30,523, and the median income for a family was $35,405. Males had a median income of $25,600 versus $17,536 for females. The per capita income for the city was $19,097. About 14.9% of families and 18.5% of the population were below the poverty line, including 29.1% of those under age 18 and 11.5% of those age 65 or over.

Government
The Georgia Department of Corrections has moved into the former Tift College site in 2010.  Burruss Correctional Training Center is located in Forsyth next to the Georgia Public Safety Training Center.

Forsyth's first African American mayor, John Howard, served from 2011 to 2015. City Councilman Eric Wilson became mayor in 2015.

Monroe County School District 
The Monroe County School District holds pre-school to grade twelve, and consists of three elementary schools, two middle schools, and a high school. The district has 225 full-time teachers and over 3,872 students.

Samuel E. Hubbard Elementary School
Katherine B. Sutton Elementary School
T.G. Scott Elementary School
Banks Stephens Middle School
William M. Hubbard Middle School
Mary Persons High School

Higher education 
Tift College was located in Forsyth.

Notable people
Harold G. Clarke, jurist and legislator
7 Little Johnstons, reality TV personality family
Eugene Talmadge, 67th governor of Georgia 1933–1937, 1941-1943

References

External links
 

Cities in Georgia (U.S. state)
Cities in Monroe County, Georgia
County seats in Georgia (U.S. state)
Macon metropolitan area, Georgia